The 1942 Utah Redskins football team was an American football team that represented the University of Utah as a member of the Mountain States Conference (MSC) during the 1942 college football season. In their 18th season under head coach Ike Armstrong, the Redskins compiled an overall record of 6–3 with a mark of 5–1 against conference opponents, sharing the MSC title with Colorado.

Schedule

After the season

NFL Draft
Utah had two players selected in the 1943 NFL Draft.

References

Utah
Utah Utes football seasons
Mountain States Conference football champion seasons
Utah Redskins football